The Grenada national football team  represents Grenada in international football and is controlled by the Grenada Football Association, a member of the Caribbean Football Union of CONCACAF. The team is nicknamed The Spice Boys, a reference to the country being dubbed as the "Island of Spice" or the "Spice Isle".

Grenada has never qualified for the World Cup but have finished second in the Caribbean Cup in 1989 and 2008.  Their second-place finish in the 2008 Caribbean Cup gave Grenada its first qualification to a major international competition, that being the 2009 CONCACAF Gold Cup.

History

Beginnings and early tournaments (1934–1989)

Granada played its first international match, on 13 October 1934, against British Guiana, which they defeated 2–1. They played British Guiana twice, Barbados and St Kitts and Nevis before the Second World War started in 1939, winning all of those contests.

In 1961, Grenada participated in the Windward Islands Tournament, losing their opening game to Saint Vincent and the Grenadines 6–3, but winning their next two matches against Saint Lucia 4–0 and Dominica 8–1 to win the tournament. Grenada won the tournament again the following year, beating Saint Vincent 2–1 in the final, and for four consecutive years from 1967 to 1970.

Grenada played their first competitive match in the 1979 CFU Championship qualifiers against Trinidad and Tobago, losing 3–1 on aggregate. Grenada entered the 1981 CONCACAF Championship qualification but lost in the preliminary round to Guyana 8–4 over two legs. Their next competitive match came in the 1985 CFU Championship qualifiers, but they lost both matches and failed to progress past the first round. Grenada had more success in the CFU Championship's successor tournament, reaching the 1989 Caribbean Cup final before losing 2–1 to Trinidad and Tobago.

Caribbean Cup and qualifiers (1990–2010)

Grenada qualified for the 1990 Caribbean Cup but lost again to Trinidad and Tobago, this time 5–0 before drawing with Jamaica 0–0 therefore failing to advance. In the qualifiers for the 1994 Caribbean Cup, Grenada was eliminated by Barbados in an infamous match where Barbados purposefully scored an own-goal in order to force overtime and help them to advance, which they did. Grenada qualified to the 1997 Caribbean Cup, reaching the semi-finals before losing to Saint Kitts and Nevis. Grenada entered the 1998 World Cup qualifiers but after getting through the preliminary round by beating Guyana 8–1 on aggregate, they lost 7–1 over two legs to Haiti.

In the 2002 World Cup qualifiers, Grenada was knocked out by Barbados who won with a tight 5–4 aggregate score. They were luckier four years later in the 2006 World Cup qualifiers, once again eliminating Guyana (8–1 on aggregate) in the first round before falling to the USA who edged them 6–2. Granada would close this decade with a new World Cup disappointment, in the 2010 World Cup qualifiers, being eliminated by Costa Rica 5–2.

Gold Cup

Nineteen years after finishing runner-up in the 1989 Caribbean Cup, the Spice Boyz once again reached the final, in the 2008 edition, although they lost to the hosts, Jamaica 2–0. However, this result allowed them to qualify for the 2009 CONCACAF Gold Cup for the first time, however Grenada failed to score a goal in the competition whilst conceding ten times and collecting no points. In the 2010 Caribbean Cup, Grenada reached the semi-finals before again being eliminated by Jamaica though their performance earned them qualification for the 2011 CONCACAF Gold Cup but they again failed to capitalise, losing all three group matches and scoring only a single goal.

2012–present

Since 2012, Grenada have not managed to progress to the Caribbean Cup or the CONCACAF Gold Cup. In the 2014 FIFA World Cup qualifiers, they finished bottom of their qualifying group despite being the top seed, then in 2018 World Cup qualification they were eliminated by Haiti in the third round.

In the 2019–20 CONCACAF Nations League qualifying, Grenada suffered its largest ever defeat, losing 10–0 against Curaçao. They'd eventually qualify for League B before earning promotion to League A for the 2022–23 CONCACAF Nations League competition.

Recent results and forthcoming fixtures
The following is a list of match results in the last 12 months, as well as any future matches that have been scheduled.

2022

2023

Coaching staff

Coaching history

 Rudi Gutendorf (1976)
 Carlos Cavagnaro (1986–87)
 Carlos Alberto da Luz (2000)
 Franklyn Simpson (2002)
 Alister De Bellotte (2004)
 Anthony Modeste (2007–08)*
 Norris Wilson (2008–09)
 Tommy Taylor (2009–10)
 Franklyn Simpson (2010–11)
 Mike Adams (2011–12)
 Alister De Bellotte (2012)
 Clark John (2013–14)
 Anthony Modeste (2014–15)
 Jorge Anon (2015)
 Andrew Munro (2016)
 Ashley Folkes (2017–2018)
 Shalrie Joseph (2018–2019)
 Andrew Munro (2019–2020)
 Michael Findlay (2021–2022)
 Mohammad Kwid (2022–present)

Players

Current squad
The following players were called up for the Nations League match against the United States on 24 March 2023.

Caps and goals correct as of 5 March 2023, after the match against Saint Lucia.

Recent call-ups
The following players have been called up within the last 12 months.

Records

Players in bold still active with Grenada.

Most appearances

Top goalscorers

Competition records

FIFA World Cup

*Draws include knockout matches decided on penalty kicks.

CONCACAF Championship & Gold Cup

CONCACAF Nations League

CFU Caribbean Cup

References

External links
Grenada at FIFA.com
Grenada at CONCACAF.com
Grenada Football Association (official website)

 
Caribbean national association football teams